Mussulman, or variants, may refer to:

 An archaic or foreign-language term for a Muslim

People
Bill Musselman (1940–2000), American basketball coach
Eric Musselman (born 1964), American basketball coach
Jeff Musselman (born 1963), American baseball player
John Rogers Musselman (1890–1968), American mathematician
Musselman's theorem, in geometry
M. M. Musselman (1899-1952), a Hollywood screenwriter and author
Maddie Musselman (born 1998), American water polo player
Mary Mussleman Whitmer (1778–1856), American Book of Mormon witness
Ron Musselman (born 1954), American baseball player

Places
Musselman, Ohio, U.S.
Musselman Lake, Ontario, Canada
Cape Musselman, Antarctica

Other uses
Musselman High School, Berkeley County, West Virginia, U.S.
Muselmann, a term for Nazi concentration camp prisoners suffering from extreme stages of starvation

See also

Muscleman